State Trunk Highway 312 (often called Highway 312, STH-312 or WIS 312) is a  long Wisconsin state highway running along the north side of Eau Claire, from the Town of Union in the west to the Town of Seymour in the east. The entire length of Highway 312 is an expressway with a few grade crossings.

The highway is a major transit route, bypassing the north side of Eau Claire by connecting Interstate 94 (I-94) with U.S. Route 53 (US 53).  The route number is derived as a "spur route" of US 12. Wisconsin Highway 312 is called the North Crossing in the Chippewa Valley.

Route description
Highway 312 begins at an interchange with I-94 (exit 59) in the town of Union. It heads east for about 0.4 miles to an intersection with US 12. East of this junction, US 12 and Highway 312 overlap for  past the Wild Ridge and Mill Run golf courses to the northwestern limits of the City of Eau Claire. The two routes split at a diamond interchange, with US 12 heading south on North Clairemont Avenue and Highway 312 continuing east as the North Crossing. Highway 312 travels another  through the northern edge of Eau Claire, crossing over the Union Pacific, Altoona subdivision railroad tracks, before reaching the bridge over the Chippewa River. After crossing the river, Highway 312 passes under the Union Pacific, Chippewa Falls subdivision railroad tracks and comes to an interchange with North Hastings Way, a former alignment of US 53.

History
The North Crossing highway, serving as an alternative to I-94 bypassing downtown Eau Claire, was opened to traffic in 1994. The name "North Crossing" developed during the planning stages of the project that culminated in the creation of the highway—the highway was designed to divert traffic crossing the Chippewa River that, prior to its creation, had to pass either through downtown Eau Claire, via the Madison St. bridge, or just west of Chippewa Falls on U.S. 53. The "North Crossing" name specifically referred to a more northerly river crossing than any other point in Eau Claire. When it came time to decide upon a name for the highway, the term "North Crossing" had already become well established in the vocabulary of the area, and so it was decided that that was the most natural name for the new roadway. WisDOT extended Highway 124 from Chippewa Falls using an overlap with North Hastings Way (then U.S. 53) to the North Crossing highway and then west along the highway to I-94.

In June 2005, the northern half of the Eau Claire Bypass (current U.S. 53 freeway) was completed and signed as Bypass U.S. 53. The North Crossing highway was extended about a mile east of North Hastings Way to meet the new freeway. This extension was also designated as part of Bypass U.S. 53. Highway 312 was first established by legislation in 2005 as a new route number for the stretch of then Highway 124 running from Interstate 94 to U.S. Highway 53. This resulted in the shortening of Highway 124 to a length and routing nearly identical to that it had in 1992 before it was extended to cover the then-new "North Crossing" in Eau Claire.  While the legislation establishing Highway 312 was intended to only take effect once the new U.S. 53 bypass of Eau Claire was completed, local authorities "jumped the gun", posting new "WIS 312" signs as early as November 2005. The southern half of the bypass opened in August 2006 and the U.S. 53 designation was relocated from North Hastings Way to the new freeway. This resulted in the retiring of the Bypass U.S. 53 designation. North Hastings Way was also turned back to local control.

Junction list

See also

References

External links

312
Transportation in Eau Claire County, Wisconsin